The 1992 ATP Buenos Aires was an ATP Challenger Series tennis tournament held in Buenos Aires, Argentina. It was the 21st edition of the tournament was held from 12 October through 19 October 1992. Juan Gisbert-Schultze won the singles title.

Finals

Singles
 Juan Gisbert-Schultze defeated  Carsten Arriens 6–1, 7–6

Doubles
 Pablo Albano /  Javier Frana defeated  Horacio de la Peña /  Gabriel Markus 2–6, 6–3, 6–4

References

External links 
 ITF tournament edition details

 
ATP Buenos Aires
ATP Buenos Aires
October 1992 sports events in South America